Overture (from French ouverture,  "opening") in music was originally the instrumental introduction to a ballet, opera, or oratorio in the 17th century. During the early Romantic era, composers such as Beethoven and Mendelssohn composed overtures which were independent, self-existing instrumental, programmatic works that foreshadowed genres such as the symphonic poem. These were "at first undoubtedly intended to be played at the head of a programme".

History

17th century
The idea of an instrumental opening to opera existed during the 17th century. Peri's Euridice opens with a brief instrumental ritornello, and Monteverdi's L'Orfeo (1607) opens with a toccata, in this case a fanfare for muted trumpets. More important, however, was the prologue, which comprised sung dialogue between allegorical characters which introduced the overarching themes of the stories depicted.

French overture

As a musical form, however, the French overture first appears in the court ballet and operatic overtures of Jean-Baptiste Lully, which he elaborated from a similar, two-section form called Ouverture, found in the French ballets de cour as early as 1640. This French overture consists of a slow introduction in a marked "dotted rhythm" (i.e., exaggerated iambic, if the first chord is disregarded), followed by a lively movement in fugato style. The overture was frequently followed by a series of dance tunes before the curtain rose, and would often return following the Prologue to introduce the action proper. This ouverture style was also used in English opera, most notably in Henry Purcell's Dido and Æneas. Its distinctive rhythmic profile and function thus led to the French overture style as found in the works of late Baroque composers such as Johann Sebastian Bach, Georg Friedrich Händel, and Georg Philipp Telemann. The style is most often used in preludes to suites, and can be found in non-staged vocal works such as cantatas, for example in the opening chorus of Bach's cantata Nun komm, der Heiden Heiland, BWV 61. Handel also uses the French overture form in some of his Italian operas such as Giulio Cesare.

Italian overture

In Italy, a distinct form called "overture" arose in the 1680s, and became established particularly through the operas of Alessandro Scarlatti, and spread throughout Europe, supplanting the French form as the standard operatic overture by the mid-18th century. Its stereotypical form is in three generally homophonic movements: fast–slow–fast. The opening movement was normally in duple metre and in a major key; the slow movement in earlier examples was usually quite short, and could be in a contrasting key; the concluding movement was dance-like, most often with rhythms of the gigue or minuet, and returned to the key of the opening section. As the form evolved, the first movement often incorporated fanfare-like elements and took on the pattern of so-called "sonatina form" (sonata form without a development section), and the slow section became more extended and lyrical. Italian overtures were often detached from their operas and played as independent concert pieces. In this context, they became important in the early history of the symphony.

18th century 
Prior to the 18th century, the symphony and the overture were almost interchangeable, with overtures being extracted from operas to serve as stand-alone instrumental works, and symphonies being tagged to the front of operas as overtures. With the reform of opera seria, the overture began to distinguish itself from the symphony, and composers began to link the content of overtures to their operas dramatically and emotionally.  Elements from the opera are foreshadowed in the overture, following the reform ideology that the music and every other element on stages serves to enhance the plot.  One such overture was that of La Magnifique by André-Ernest-Modeste Grétry, in which several of the arias are quoted. This "medley form" persists in the overtures to many works of musical theatre written in the 20th and 21st centuries.

19th-century opera
In 19th-century opera the overture, Vorspiel, Einleitung, Introduction, or whatever else it may be called, is generally nothing more definite than that portion of the music which takes place before the curtain rises. Richard Wagner's Vorspiel to Lohengrin is a short self-contained movement founded on the music of the Grail.

In Italian opera after about 1800, the "overture" became known as the sinfonia. Fisher also notes the term Sinfonia avanti l'opera (literally, the "symphony before the opera") was "an early term for a sinfonia used to begin an opera, that is, as an overture as opposed to one serving to begin a later section of the work".

Concert overture

Early 19th century
Although by the end of the eighteenth century opera overtures were already beginning to be performed as separate items in the concert hall,  the "concert overture", intended specifically as an individual concert piece without reference to stage performance and generally based  on some literary theme, began to appear early in the Romantic era. Carl Maria von Weber wrote two concert overtures, Der Beherrscher der Geister ('The Ruler of the Spirits', 1811, a revision of the overture to his unfinished opera Rübezahl of 1805), and Jubel-Ouvertüre ('Jubilee Overture', 1818, incorporating God Save the King at its climax). However, the overture A Midsummer Night's Dream (1826) by Felix Mendelssohn is generally regarded as the first concert overture. Mendelssohn's other contributions to this genre include his Calm Sea and Prosperous Voyage overture (1828), his overture The Hebrides (1830; also known as Fingal's Cave) and the overtures Die schöne Melusine (The Fair Melusine, 1834) and Ruy Blas (1839).  Other notable early concert overtures were written by Hector Berlioz (e.g., Les Francs juges (1826), and Le corsaire (1828)).

Later 19th century
In the 1850s the concert overture began to be supplanted by the symphonic poem, a form devised by Franz Liszt in several works that began as dramatic overtures. The distinction between the two genres was the freedom to mould the musical form according to external programmatic requirements. The symphonic poem became the preferred form for the more "progressive" composers, such as César Franck,  Camille Saint-Saëns, Richard Strauss, Alexander Scriabin, and Arnold Schoenberg, while more conservative composers like Anton Rubinstein, Tchaikovsky, Johannes Brahms, Robert Schumann and Arthur Sullivan remained faithful to the overture.

In the age when the symphonic poem had already become popular, Brahms wrote his Academic Festival Overture, Op. 80, as well as his Tragic Overture, Op. 81. An example clearly influenced by the symphonic poem is  Tchaikovsky's 1812 Overture. His equally well-known Romeo and Juliet is also labelled a 'fantasy-overture'.

20th century
In European music after 1900, an example of an overture displaying a connection with the traditional form is Dmitri Shostakovich's Festive Overture, Op. 96 (1954), which is in two linked sections, "Allegretto" and "Presto" (Temperely 2001).  Malcolm Arnold's A Grand, Grand Overture, Op. 57 (1956), is a 20th-century parody of the late 19th century concert overture, scored for an enormous orchestra with organ, additional brass instruments, and obbligato parts for four rifles, three Hoover vacuum cleaners (two uprights in B, one horizontal with detachable sucker in C), and an electric floor polisher in E; it is dedicated "to President Hoover"

Film
In motion pictures, an overture is a piece of music setting the mood for the film before the opening credits start. For a comprehensive list, see the list of films with overtures.

List of standard repertoire
Some well-known or commonly played overtures:

Anton Arensky: A Dream on the Volga
Malcolm Arnold:
Beckus the Dandipratt
Peterloo
Tam O'Shanter
Daniel Auber: Fra Diavolo
Samuel Barber: Overture to The School for Scandal
Arnold Bax: Overture to a Picaresque Comedy
Ludwig van Beethoven:
Leonora Nr 1
Leonora Nr 2
Leonora Nr 3
Fidelio
Coriolan Overture
Egmont
The Ruins of Athens
 Arthur Benjamin
Overture to an Italian Comedy
Hector Berlioz:
Benvenuto Cellini
Le carnaval romain
Le corsair
Les Francs-Juges
King Lear
Waverley	
Leonard Bernstein: Candide
Georges Bizet: Carmen
Alexander Borodin: Prince Igor
Johannes Brahms:
Academic Festival Overture
Tragic Overture
Anton Bruckner: Overture in G minor (WAB 98)
Aaron Copland: An Outdoor Overture
Antonín Dvořák: Carnival Overture
Edward Elgar:
In the South (Alassio)
Cockaigne
Froissart
George Gershwin: 
Cuban Overture
Overture to Strike Up the Band
Philip Glass:
Overture 2012
King Lear Overture
Mikhail Glinka: Ruslan and Lyudmila
Antônio Carlos Gomes: Il Guarany
Edvard Grieg: In Autumn
George Frideric Handel
Overture to the Music for the Royal Fireworks
Overture to the Water Music
Overture to Messiah and other Ortraios
Joseph Haydn: Armida
Ferdinand Hérold: Zampa
John Ireland:
A London Overture
Satyricon Overture
Édouard Lalo: Le roi d'Ys
Franz Lehár: The Merry Widow
Hamish MacCunn: The Land of the Mountain and the Flood
Felix Mendelssohn:
The Hebrides (or Fingal's Cave)
Calm Sea and Prosperous Voyage
A Midsummer Night's Dream
Ruy Blas
Nikolai Myaskovsky:
Pathetic Overture
Salutation Overture
Wolfgang Amadeus Mozart:
The Marriage of Figaro
La clemenza di Tito
Così fan tutte
Don Giovanni
Idomeneo
Die Entführung aus dem Serail
The Magic Flute
Otto Nicolai: The Merry Wives of Windsor
Carl Nielsen:
Maskarade
Helios Overture
Jacques Offenbach:
Orpheus in the Underworld
Sergei Prokofiev: Overture on Hebrew Themes
Emil von Reznicek: Donna Diana
Nikolai Rimsky-Korsakov: Russian Easter Festival Overture
Gioachino Rossini:
La cambiale di matrimonio
Tancredi
Il signor Bruschino
Il turco in Italia
La Cenerentola
Semiramide
Il viaggio a Reims
The Barber of Seville
La gazza ladra
L'italiana in Algeri
La scala di seta
William Tell
Franz Schubert:
Overture in Italian Style, D590
Rosamunde
Robert Schumann:
Overture, Scherzo and Finale, Op 52
Manfred
Genoveva
Faust
Julius Caesar
Hermann und Dorothea
The Bride of Messina
Dmitri Shostakovich: Festive Overture
Bedřich Smetana: The Bartered Bride
Johann Strauss: Die Fledermaus
Jean Sibelius: Overture to The Tempest
Arthur Sullivan:
The Mikado
The Gondoliers
The Yeomen of the Guard
Franz von Suppé
Light Cavalry Overture
The Beautiful Galatea
Poet and Peasant
Pyotr Ilyich Tchaikovsky:
1812 Overture
Hamlet (Overture-Fantasy)
Romeo and Juliet (Overture-Fantasy)
The Nutcracker (Miniature Overture)
Giuseppe Verdi: 
La forza del destino
Nabucco
I vespri siciliani
Richard Wagner:
Faust Overture
Rienzi
The Flying Dutchman
Tannhäuser
Die Meistersinger von Nürnberg
Ralph Vaughan Williams: The Wasps
William Walton
Johannesburg Festival Overture
Scapino Overture
Portsmouth Point Overture
Carl Maria von Weber:
Euryanthe
Der Freischütz
Oberon

Notes

References

 
 
 
 
 
 
 
 
 
 
 
 
 

 
Musical terminology